Pterolophia mimica is a species of beetle in the family Cerambycidae. It was described by Gressitt in 1942, originally under the genus Lychrosis.

References

mimica
Beetles described in 1942